Garia may refer to:

Places 
Garia, a neighbourhood of south Kolkata, India
Garia, Newfoundland and Labrador

People 
Garia, a clan of the Bharwad people found mostly in India

Events 
Garia puja, a festival in Tripura, India